VyStar Veterans Memorial Arena (originally Jacksonville Veterans Memorial Arena) is a multi-purpose arena located in Jacksonville, Florida. It currently serves as the home arena of the Jacksonville Icemen of the ECHL, the Jacksonville Giants of the American Basketball Association, and the Jacksonville Sharks of the National Arena League.

About
The arena was built in 2003 as part of the Better Jacksonville Plan to replace the Jacksonville Coliseum.

On March 12, 2019, a 19–0 vote led to VyStar Credit Union becoming a sponsor for the arena. The 15-year agreement includes an annual contribution to the veterans trust fund along with upkeep of the arena. It is corporately sponsored despite a city ordinance that on its face prohibits the arena from having such a name. The ordinance does not cover any other venues, which allows for two other venues in Duval County to have corporate sponsors, most notably TIAA Bank Field.

Naming history
 Jacksonville Veterans Memorial Arena 
 VyStar Veterans Memorial Arena

Events and history
The arena was designed, using state-of-the-art techniques, to have the acoustical characteristics necessary for concerts. The first artist to hold a concert in the Arena was Elton John in November 2003. Since that time, dozens of groups, including country, rap, rock, and others, have performed at the arena.

Ice hockey
The arena was home to the Jacksonville Barracudas ice hockey team from 2003 to 2007 until they relocated to a smaller hockey arena in the area.

Olympics
Sporting events hosted include the 2004 USA Men's Olympic basketball team in their only game played in the United States, as well as some early round games of the NCAA Division I men's basketball tournament in 2006, 2010, 2015, and 2019.

UFC
The arena held UFC 249: Ferguson vs. Gaethje, UFC Fight Night: Smith vs. Teixeira, and UFC on ESPN: Overeem vs. Harris,and  three consecutive Ultimate Fighting Championship events in May 2020, the first major sporting events to be held in the country after restrictions to slow the COVID-19 pandemic went into effect in March. In April 2021 it hosted UFC 261: Usman vs. Masvidal 2, in front of the largest crowd for an indoor sport in more than a year after Florida lifted their restrictions. In April 2022, it hosted UFC 273: Volkanovski vs. The Korean Zombie.

Professional wrestling
On October 17, 2006, an episode of ECW on Sci-Fi was held in the arena. In 2007, the arena held the WWE pay-per-view event One Night Stand in 2007. However, the arena still hosts various Raw and SmackDown shows.

AFL
The arena found huge success when the arena became the home of the Jacksonville Sharks in 2010 when they were introduced as an expansion team of the Arena Football League. The team was founded by former Orlando Predators executive Jeff Bouchy, who is also the brother of former Orlando Predators owner Brett Bouchy. The Sharks generally have maintained the highest attendance among the arena's regular tenants.

ABA
The arena hosted the 2011 ABA All-Star Game, which took place on February 26, 2011.

PLL
In 2012, the arena was home to the Jacksonville Bullies of the Professional Lacrosse League.

LFL
In 2013 and 2014, it was home to the Jacksonville Breeze of the Legends Football League.

Concerts
In 2016, Rihanna opened her Anti World Tour at the arena, which attracted an audience of 11,000 people.

On December 1, 2019 Ariana Grande held a concert at the arena, which was part of her Sweetener World Tour.
Monster Jam came to the arena in 2018, and again the following year.

Other events
The arena was scheduled to host days 2-4 of the 2020 Republican National Convention from August 25 to August 27, originally to be held in Charlotte, North Carolina. However, these plans were ultimately cancelled to the COVID-19 pandemic.

The arena was the host for the Davis Cup first round tie between the US and Brazil on the weekend of February 1–3, 2013. It has hosted PBR Built Ford Tough Series events in the past.

Noted performers

5 Seconds of Summer
AC/DC
Aerosmith
Alice Cooper
Ariana Grande
Breaking Benjamin
Britney Spears
Brooks & Dunn
Carrie Underwood
Céline Dion
Cher  
Dave Matthews Band
Def Leppard
Duran Duran
Eagles
Elton John
Paul McCartney
Eric Church
Eric Clapton
Faith Hill
Fall Out Boy
Fleetwood Mac
Garth Brooks
Green Day
Guns N' Roses
Hall & Oates
Imagine Dragons
Janet Jackson
Jimmy Buffett
John Legend
John Mayer
Jonas Brothers
Journey
Justin Bieber
Kanye West
Kenny Chesney
Keyshia Cole
Kid Rock
KISS
Korn
Lynyrd Skynyrd
Machine Gun Kelly
Maroon 5
Matchbox Twenty
Miley Cyrus
Miranda Lambert
Mötley Crüe
New Kids on the Block 
Nickelback 
Pearl Jam
Phish
Post Malone
Prince
R. Kelly
Red Hot Chili Peppers
Rihanna
Rush
Shania Twain
Stevie Nicks
Taylor Swift
The Black Eyed Peas
The Who
Tim McGraw
TobyMac
Trans-Siberian Orchestra
Usher
Van Halen

References

Music venues completed in 2003
American Basketball Association (2000–present) venues
Indoor arenas in Florida
Indoor ice hockey venues in Florida
Indoor lacrosse venues in the United States
Sports venues in Jacksonville, Florida
Jacksonville Dolphins men's basketball
Music venues in Florida
Sports venues completed in 2003
Downtown Jacksonville
Sports Complex, Jacksonville
2003 establishments in Florida
Postmodern architecture in Florida